Határ út is a station on the M3 (North-South) line of the Budapest Metro. Near the station, there are several tram and bus terminus, and a shopping centre. Határ út station named after the adjacent street Határ út, which literally means "(City) Border Street". Before the formation of Greater Budapest it was the border of Budapest Capital. The station was opened on 20 April 1980 as part of the extension from Nagyvárad tér to Kőbánya-Kispest.

Connections
Bus: 66, 66B, 66E, 84E, 89E, 94E, 99, 123, 123A, 142E, 194, 194B, 199, 294E
Regional bus: 626, 628, 629, 660
Tram:  42, 50, 52

References
Budapest City Atlas, Dimap-Szarvas, Budapest, 2011,

External links
Határ út station on Youtube

M3 (Budapest Metro) stations
Railway stations opened in 1980
Transit centers in Hungary